The CDP (formerly the Carbon Disclosure Project) is an international non-profit organisation based in the United Kingdom, Japan, India, China, Germany, Brazil and the United States of America that helps companies and cities disclose their environmental impact. It aims to make environmental reporting and risk management a business norm, driving disclosure, insight, and action towards a sustainable economy. In 2022, nearly 20,000 organizations disclosed their environmental information through CDP.

Background 
CDP piggybacked on GRI's concept of environmental disclosure in 2002, focusing on individual companies rather than on nations. At the time CDP had just 35 investors signing its request for climate information and 245 companies responding. Today, nearly a fifth of global greenhouse gas emissions are reported through CDP.

Some corporations have higher greenhouse gas emissions than individual nation states. Some leading companies have moved to become carbon neutral, but for others there is the scope to reduce energy usage and greenhouse gas-emissions through the adoption of energy-efficiency methods and business planning.

Mechanism 
CDP works with over 18,500 corporations, as well as over 550 cities and 100 states and regions to help them on effective carbon emissions reductions strategies. The collection of self-reported data from the companies is supported by over 800 institutional investors with about US$100 trillion in assets.

Much of the data elicited has never been collected before. This information is helpful to investors, corporations, and regulators in making informed decisions on taking action towards a sustainable economy by measuring and understanding their environmental impact and taking steps to address and limit their risk to climate change, deforestation and water security.

CDP's programs

Climate change 
CDP's climate change program aims to reduce companies' greenhouse gas emissions and mitigate climate change risk. CDP requests information on climate risks and low carbon opportunities from the world's largest companies on behalf of over 800 institutional investor signatories with a combined US$100 trillion in assets.

Water 
The program motivates companies to disclose and reduce their environmental impacts by using the power of investors and companies.

Supply chain 
In 2016, some 90 organizations, representing over US$2.5 trillion of purchasing power, requested that their suppliers disclose information on how they are approaching climate and water risks and opportunities. Data was gathered from over 4,000 suppliers worldwide, who reported over US$12 billion worth of savings from emission reduction activities.

Forests 
CDP's forests program has over 290 signatory investors in its network, which collectively represent about US$19 trillion in combined assets. CDP collects information about the four agricultural commodities responsible for most deforestation: timber, palm oil, cattle and soy. CDP's forests program was first set up by the UK Government's Department for International Development via the Global Canopy Programme and the JMG Foundation.

Cities 
CDP Cities provides a platform for cities to measure, manage and disclose their environmental data. More than 500 cities are now measuring and disclosing environmental data annually. The potential and need for this program is enormous since over 56% of the world's population now live in cities. CDP Cities provides a global platform based upon a simple questionnaire that allows city governments to disclose their greenhouse gas emission data publicly. One of the greatest values of the annual report, first released in June 2011, is to city leaders who can identify peers who are addressing similar risks and issues with new and innovative strategies for reducing carbon emissions and for mitigating risk from climate change.

Carbon Action initiative 
Carbon Action is an investor-led initiative which shows how companies in investment portfolios are managing carbon emissions and energy efficiency.

Over 300 investors with US$25 trillion in assets under management ask the world's highest emitting companies to take three specific actions in response to climate change:
 Make emissions reductions (year-on-year)
 Publicly disclose emission reduction targets
 Make ROI-positive investments in projects

CDP launched a new research series at the beginning of 2015, taking a sector by sector approach.

Leadership indices 
CDP recognizes companies with high-quality disclosure in its annual scoring process, with top companies making it onto CDP's so-called A-list.

Scores are calculated according to a standardized method which measures whether and how well, a company responds to each question. A company goes through four main steps, starting with disclosure of their current position, moving to awareness which looks at whether a company is conscious of its environmental impact, to management, and finally leadership.

A high CDP score is supposed to be indicative of a company's environmental awareness, advanced sustainability governance and leadership to address climate change.

Organisational structure and governance 
CDP includes three separate legal entities registered in the United Kingdom, Belgium and the United States of America. In the United Kingdom, CDP Worldwide is a charity registered with the Charity Commission for England and Wales. CDP Europe is a registered charity in Brussels, Belgium and Berlin, Germany. CDP North America, Inc is an independent 501(c)(3) entity based in New York City. The three entities have independent trustee boards.

Funding 
CDP's funding comes from a combination of government and philanthropic grants (44.4%) and a mixture of membership fees, administrative fees, sponsorships and data licensing. In Europe, CDP is around 30% funded by the LIFE programme of the European Commission.

Relevance of CDP

Studies on the CDP 
 
 
 
 
 
 
 
 
 
 
 
 
 
 
 Kumar, Praveen; Mittal, Amit; Firoz, Mohammad (2020). "Carbon credit issuance: accounting based financial performance". SCMS Journal of Indian Management. 17(2): 111–119.

Corporate recognition of the CDP 
In 2010, CDP was called "The most powerful green NGO you've never heard of" by the Harvard Business Review. In 2012 it won the Zayed Future Energy Prize.

See also 
Carbon accounting
Carbon footprint
Global warming
Greenhouse debt
Science Based Targets initiative

References

External links 
 
 2011 (first) annual report from the CDP Cities program
 About the Carbon Disclosure Project (CDP)
 Reporting using GRI and CDP – Similarities and Differences

Environmental science
Environmental organisations based in the United Kingdom
Greenhouse gases
Greenhouse gas emissions
Greenhouse gas inventories